St. Mark's High School is a Roman Catholic co-education secondary school situated just outside Warrenpoint, County Down, Northern Ireland.

It first opened its doors in 1971 when 120 pupils attended.

Academics
The school provides instruction in a range of academic subjects. In 2018, 52% of its entrants achieved five or more GCSEs at grades A* to C, including the core subjects English and Maths. Also in 2018, 60% of its entrants to the A-level exam achieved A*-C grades.

Sport
The school won the U-16 Ulster title in 2014 and the U-18 title in 2015 in Gaelic football.

References  

Secondary schools in County Down
Catholic secondary schools in Northern Ireland